The 45th Daytime Emmy Awards, presented by the National Academy of Television Arts and Sciences (NATAS), "recognizes outstanding achievement in all fields of daytime television production and are presented to individuals and programs broadcast from 2:00 a.m. to 6:00 p.m. during the 2017 calendar year". The ceremony took place on April 29, 2018 at the Pasadena Civic Auditorium in Pasadena, California.

The drama pre-nominees were announced on January 25, 2018, and the standard nominations were announced on March 21, 2018, during an episode of The Talk. ABC's General Hospital has the most nominations with 26. The 45th Daytime Creative Arts Emmy Awards ceremony, for extended Daytime Emmy categories, were held at the Pasadena Civic Auditorium on April 27, 2018.

Mario Lopez and Sheryl Underwood returned to host the ceremony, which was broadcast as a live webcast via various live streaming and social networking services (including Facebook, Twitter, and YouTube), forgoing a traditional television broadcast for the third year in a row.

Winners and nominees

Winners are listed first, highlighted in boldface.

Lifetime Achievement Awards
The NATAS announced the following winners of the Lifetime Achievement Award on February 1, 2018:
 Bill and Susan Seaforth Hayes, long-running actors on Days of Our Lives
 The Hayes were honored during the main ceremony on April 29
 Sid and Marty Krofft, who were influential in children's television and variety show programs
 The Kroffts were honored during the Creative Arts ceremony on April 27.

Presenters and performances
The following individuals presented awards or performed musical acts.

Presenters (in order of appearance)

Performers

In Memoriam
Joely Fisher performed "Astonishing" from Little Women as the following people were honored:

 Monty Hall
 Della Reese
 Wendy Drew
 Patti Deutsch
 Harry Eggart
 Carole Hart
 Lin Bolen
 Bud Luckey
 David Ogden Stiers
 Clay Virtue
 Bill Turner
 Mark LaMura
 Ed Greene
 Donnelly Rhodes
 John Morris
 Warren Burton
 Rose Marie
 Jim Czak
 Heather North
 Anne Jeffreys
 Samantha Stone
 Bradford Dillman
 Harry Anderson
 Chuck McCann
 Robert Guillaume
 Charles Bradley
 John Conboy
 Ann Wedgeworth
 Jim Nabors
 Frank Avruch
 June Foray

References

045
2018 in American television
2018 television awards
2018 in Los Angeles
April 2018 events in the United States